Olca is a stratovolcano on the border of Chile and Bolivia. It lies in the middle of a 15 km long ridge composed of several stratovolcanos. Cerro Minchincha lies to the west and Paruma to the east. It is also close to the pre-Holocene Cerro Paruma. It is andesitic and dacitic in composition, with lava flows extending several kilometres north of the peak. The only activity from the ridge during historical times was a flank eruption from 1865 to 1867. The exact source of this eruption is unclear.

Gas emissions and composition 
The gasses emission is comprised by a single warm spring at the base and a persistent fumarole field over at the crater's dome for at least 60 years. The fumarolic field is about 0.1 km2  and the emissions measured in situ at the crater show a highly mixed magmatic system between high temperature temperature gasses and hydrothermal fluids.

The gas composition indicates low concentration of H2, CO and acidic gasses, and high concentration of H2S and hydrocarbons. The carbon/sulfur ratios are high and the isotopic values suggest the mixture between magmatic, hydrothermal, and atmospheric fluids. Other techniques used to measure the amount of SO2 includes remote sensing techniques called Differential Optical Absorption Spectroscopy(DOAS) giving maximum concentration of 35 ppm.m of SO2; and the most recent taken with a UV camera suggesting an average of 18.4 t d−1.

Eruptive history and latest activity 
Different information exists regarding the activity and activity migration of Olca. There is a study dating two flows, which suggest a formation during the Pleistocene, while others suggest to be much older with the appearance of the edifices volcanic activity migrated east over time. There is also evidence that glaciers were on the volcano in the late Pleistocene. The

Unconfirmed historical eruptions are suspected to have occurred in 1865–1867. The last activity has been reported of low-intensity seismicity accompanied with fumarolic activity in November 1989 and March 1990 intense degassing. In 2010, there a campaign conducted seismic activity showing 3 potencial swarms without a clear interpretation.

See also
 Ollagüe
 List of volcanoes in Bolivia
 List of volcanoes in Chile

References

Sources

External links 
 Population data and map of San Pedro de Quemes Municipality

Stratovolcanoes of Chile
Volcanoes of Antofagasta Region
Subduction volcanoes
Volcanoes of Potosí Department
Polygenetic volcanoes
Bolivia–Chile border
International mountains of South America
Pleistocene stratovolcanoes
Holocene stratovolcanoes